"Fire on Fire" is a song by English singer Sam Smith, produced by Steve Mac. It was co-written by Smith and Mac for the 2018 Netflix adaptation of the 1972 novel Watership Down. "Fire on Fire" was released as a single on 21 December 2018 through Capitol Records. It charted in the top 40 in Hungary, Sweden, Norway, Finland, Switzerland and Ireland. The song appears on Smith's third studio album, Love Goes (2020).

Background
The track was written by Sam Smith and producer/songwriter Steve Mac, and recorded with the BBC Concert Orchestra at London's Abbey Road Studios in September 2018. Smith said in a statement: "I am so excited and honored to be a part of this new adaptation of Watership Down. This story is so powerful and timeless, and it has been thrilling to work with the director Noam Murro and his team and the incredible Steve Mac on this song for it. I hope everyone loves it as much as I do."

Critical reception
Gil Kaufman from Billboard called "Fire on Fire" a haunting and stirring ballad. He wrote that Smith's emotional theme song taps into the story's roller-coaster of fear, hope and friendship.

Music video
The music video for "Fire on Fire" was released on 21 December 2018.

Charts

Weekly charts

Year-end charts

Release history

Certifications

References

2010s ballads
2018 singles
2018 songs
Pop ballads
Sam Smith (singer) songs
Soul ballads
Songs written by Sam Smith (singer)
Songs written by Steve Mac
Song recordings produced by Steve Mac